Mikura (御蔵) was the lead ship of the Mikura-class escort ship of Imperial Japanese Navy.

Construction and career 
She was laid down on 1 October 1942 and launched on 31 October 1943 by the Nippon Kokan Tsurumi Shipyard. She was commissioned on 31 October 1943.

1943 
On 14 November 1943, the 3114 convoy (Takebe Maru and Daido Maru) was escorted and departed from Yokosuka to Chuuk Lagoon. On the 15th, the Second Maritime Escort Flotilla will be subordinate to the Maritime Escort General Headquarters. They arrived on the 27th.

On December 5, she escorted the 4205 convoy (Akihayama Maru and Soyo Maru) with Hirado and departed from the truck for Yokosuka. On the 7th, she stayed at the scene for rescue because the Soyo Maru was struck by torpedoes fires from USS Pogy, Mikura then escorted the Akihayama Maru and headed for Saipan. Arrived in Saipan on the 10th. 4205 Oto Fleet adds Satsuma Maru in Saipan and departs Saipan for the inland on the 12th. While sailing inland, he fought an anti-submarine war off the coast of Iwo Jima, but was damaged by contact with an escorted transport ship. Arrived in Yokosuka on the 20th.

1944 
From January 4th to February 8th, 1944, she was docked at Nippon Kokan Asano Shipyard & Machinery Works. After leaving the dock, she made a round trip to Yokosuka. 

On February 11, she escorted the fleet and departed from Yokosuka. Arrived in Saipan on the 19th. Departed from Saipan on the 27th, escorting a fleet to Chuuk. March 5, arrived at the Chuuk. 

On March 6, she departed Chuuk for the inland. Called at the relay station Saipan on the 10th and arrived in Yokosuka on the 19th. 

On April 1, escorted the Higashimatsu No. 4 fleet and departed from Kisarazu. On the evening of the 9th, the ship once entered Saipan, but re-sorted on the same night. On the 10th, the Higashimatsu No. 4 fleet was dismissed in Saipan and the ship returned to command of the 2nd Maritime Escort Flotilla, but the ship continued to escort the fleet for trucks. On the 12th, a depth charge attacks were carried out but the submarine escaped. Arrived at the truck on the 15th. On the 22nd, a Chuuk departed for the inland. On the 26th, he called at the relay station Saipan and arrived at Yokosuka on May 4. 

Departed from Yokosuka on May 15th, escorting the fleet for Saipan / Palau. Called at the relay station Saipan on the 25th. After calling at the port, engaged in anti-submarine alert off the coast of Saipan. On the 30th, escorted the fleet for Palau and departed from Saipan. Arrival in Palau on June 6. 

On June 12, she escorted the fleet and left Palau for Saipan, but the fleet changed its destination to Davao due to an air raid on an American carrier-based aircraft in Saipan. Arrived in Davao on the 18th. On the same day, transferred under the command of Operation 1st Maritime Escort Flotilla. On the 20th, escort the fleet and head for the gusset. Returned to Davao on the 22nd. On the 30th, Davao was dispatched as a single ship to join the Seda 01 fleet. Returned to Davao on July 3.

Departed from Davao on July 6, 1944, she escorted the Dama 01 fleet to Manila. Arrived in Manila on the 13th. On the 15th, she escorted the Mi 08 fleet and left Manila, but due to a typhoon, the fleet returned to Manila. On the 17th, with the spring breeze, Manila was dispatched to reinforce the Tama 21C fleet. On the 18th, she would head to the reinforcement of the Hi-69 fleet. On the same day, the 2nd Maritime Escort Corps was disbanded and the ship was transferred to the 1st Maritime Escort Corps. Returned to Manila on the 20th. On the 23rd, she escorted the Hi-68 fleet and headed inland from Manila. Called at Kaohsiung on the 28th. August 3, six consecutive arrivals.

Rounded to Sasebo on August 4. Maintenance will be carried out at the Sasebo Naval Arsenal from the 5th to the 7th. On the 8th, she had a temporary stay in Imari. On the 10th, he escorted the Hi-71 fleet and departed from Imari. On the 13th, the fleet called at Magong due to bad weather. On the 17th, she continued to escort the Hi-71 fleet and departed. On the 18th, the fleet suffered damage from a submarine attack and evacuated to San Fernando on the 19th. On the 20th, the ship set sail in San Fernando and engaged in anti-submarine sweeping in collaboration with the aircraft. Arrived in Manila on the 21st. On the 26th, she continued to escort the Hi-71 fleet and departed from Manila. Arrival in Singapore on September 1.

On September 6, she escorted the Hi-72 fleet and departed from Singapore. On the 12th, the fleet was attacked by a submarine and two transport ships, as well as the Shikinami and Hirado were sunk. The ship rescued the Shikinami crew after the depth charge attacks. On the 13th, the fleet once evacuated to Narabayashi, but the ship returned to the distress site for rescue. Returned to Narabayashi on the 14th. On the 16th, she escorted the first branch of the Hi-72 Fleet (Asaka Maru) and left for Sasebo. On the night of the 20th, the ship and the Asaka Maru was damaged by an attack by a US Army Air Corps aircraft while navigating the Taiwan Strait. Asaka Maru was escorted by the No. 10 Sea Defense Ship and headed for Magong, but the ship was unable to navigate due to one direct hit and several nearby bullets, and its whereabouts were unknown. On the 23rd, the ship was found in the middle of drifting from an airplane, and was escorted by the 18th Kaibokan to Iturup and made a round trip to Magong. From the 26th, the Magong Navy Engineering Department docked and carried out restoration and repair.

1945 
On March 6, an anti-submarine sweep was carried out with the No. 34 Kaibokan. On the 9th, in collaboration with the 33rd Kaibokan, rescue the 69th Kaibokan, which was damaged while escorting the Yumo 01 fleet and became inoperable. The No. 33 Kaibokan towed the No. 69 Kaibokan, and this ship was the escort for them. Operation AS1 ends on the 12th. On the 13th, the 102nd Squadron was transferred to the AS2 Operation Unit. On the 16th, the No. 69 Kaibokan sank due to wind waves, so the ships rescued the crew and made a round trip to Hong Kong. Operation AS2 ends on the 17th. On the 18th, the ship escorted the fleet (2 ships) and headed inland from Hong Kong. On the 19th, while sailing inland, the 102nd Squadron was transferred to the AS3 Operation Unit. Arrived at Moji on the 26th. On the 27th, the 2nd Fleet, the 1st Squadron, was training in Saeki to guard the 2nd Fleet, Oga, Meto, the 59th Kaibokan, the 65th Kaibokan, and 3 special minesweepers. Was organized as a third anti-submarine minesweeper. In addition, the ship and the 33rd Kaibokan, which had been returned to Monji from Hong Kong as support, and a special submarine chaser of the Saiki Defense Force were added, and an aircraft of the Saiki Air Corps equipped with a magnetic detector. Was also mobilized. The deployment point and patrol method were decided within the 27th. On the 27th, the main ship and the 33rd Kaibokan set sail for Moji, and on March 28, the following day, four ships under Oga set sail for Saeki. The Third Anti-Submarine Squadron fixed the course to the south from the area beyond the Mizunokojima Lighthouse and started the search. Each ship of the 3rd Anti-Submarine Squadron took a single horizontal formation 4 nautical miles away from 3 nautical miles, with the 65th Kaibokan located on the westernmost side. At around 10:27 am, the aircraft detected the submarine, but soon lost sight of it. Nevertheless, from around midnight, the ship and the No. 33 Kaibokan merged, located 1,000 meters west of the No. 65 Kaibokan in a single line of battle, and rushed to the detection site with the No. 59 Kaibokan. As a result of a depth charge attack from around 13:00, two large eruptions rose. This point is recorded as 180 degrees 39.5 nautical miles in Tsurumisaki or 32 degrees 16 minutes north latitude 132 degrees 05 minutes east longitude. When re-observed on the morning of March 29, the following day, a thick oil zone was flowing out from the attack point. The attack sank USS Trigger and the ship was allegedly involved in it.

Around the evening of the same day, the news was unknown in the south of Kyushu and she was found sunk. The 33rd Kaibokan, which she was with, was also sunk by an air raid. According to US records such as The Official Chronology of the US Navy in World War II, the ship was sunk by a torpedo attack by the USS Threadfin on the same day. At 16:45, the No. 33 Kaibokan discovered and reported an enemy aircraft, but Threadfin sank Mikura at this point according to American records. It is almost the same as the sinking point of the No. 33 Kaibokan described in The Official Chronology of the US Navy in World War II. In addition, Threadfin was sunk alone in Roscoe, and the 33rd Kaibokan was sunk by a USS Hornet aircraft. Kimata's "Enemy Submarine Attack" and "History of the Battle of the Sea of Japan", War Diary of the 1st Escort Fleet (March 1-31 1945), War Diary of the 102nd Squadron (March 1-31 1945) ) did not mention that it was sunk by Threadfin, but in the section of the escort ship of Kaibokan Senki, as a witness of the 65th Kaibokan voyage chief, "I was attacked by an enemy task force's plane and submarine, 1200 Around that time, Mikura was sunk by the torpedo attack of an enemy submarine, and there were no survivors." It is unclear in conclusion whether it was the Threadfin, the 58th Task Force, or the joint sink that really sank Mikura, but as mentioned above, at least Roscoe has recognized it as a joint battle result.

216 crew members under Major Ryusuke Oda, Captain of the Mikura Sea Defense, and 171 crew members under Major Masaharu Morimoto, Captain of the 33rd Sea Defense, were all killed in action, and there were no survivors.

On May 25, Mikura was removed from the Imperial Kaibokan.

References 

Ships built in Japan
1943 ships
Ships sunk by American submarines
World War II shipwrecks in the Pacific Ocean